The Purcari is a right tributary of the river Gilort in Romania. It flows into the Gilort near Vladimir.

References

Rivers of Romania
Rivers of Gorj County